The Yorkshire League and the Lancashire League formed two sections of the Rugby Football League Championship for much of its history. Initially, the 22 clubs that broke away in 1895 played in one combined league; however, the following season saw the addition of many clubs, and the League was split into two separate county competitions.

History
This situation endured until 1901-02, when the top teams in each league resigned and formed a new combined first division. The following season, the remaining clubs formed a second division. From then until 1907, when there was another re-organisation, the county leagues were not played.

The new structure initiated for the 1907-08 season saw the clubs playing every other team in their own county home and away, and playing once each against the clubs from the other county. Results from all games counted towards the Rugby Football League Championship, whilst results within the county counted towards the respective county leagues.

The championship often included teams from outside the Yorkshire and Lancashire heartlands; these were allocated to a county league on a practical basis. Briefly, in the 1908-09 season, there were enough clubs from Wales to add a third Welsh League to the structure. The sole winner of this title was Merthyr Tydfil.

The Yorkshire and Lancashire Leagues were abandoned in 1970.

Lancashire League

The RFL Lancashire League was an annual competition from 1895 to 1970 for professional rugby league teams in Lancashire. Other teams from Cheshire and Cumbria also competed in the league During the period 1896-1901 the county leagues were played as there was no national league championship during this period. After they were played alongside the RFL Championship until 1970. Teams also competed in the Lancashire Cup.

Championship

Wins by club

Yorkshire League

The RFL Yorkshire League was an annual competition from 1895 to 1970 for professional rugby league teams in Yorkshire. During the period 1896-1901 the county leagues were played as there was no national league championship during this period. After they were played alongside the RFL Championship until 1970. Teams also competed in the Yorkshire Cup.

Championship

Wins by club

Notes

References

External links

Rugby league competitions in the United Kingdom